Quello Cocha or Q'illuqucha (Quechua q'illu yellow, qucha lake, "yellow lake", also spelled Quellococha) is a mountain in the Andes of Peru which reaches a height of approximately  . It is located in the Huancavelica Region, Tayacaja Province, Colcabamba District.

References

Mountains of Peru
Mountains of Huancavelica Region